Juniperus pseudosabina, the Turkestan juniper  or dwarf black juniper is a species of juniper.

Description
Juvenile leaves are found mainly on seedlings but mature plants continue to bear some juvenile leaves as well as adult, particularly on shoots damaged by browsing.

It is largely dioecious with separate male and female plants, but some individual plants produce both sexes. The cones are berry-like, 8–14 mm long and 7–10 mm diameter, blue-black with a whitish waxy bloom, and contain a single seed; they are mature in about 18 months. The male cones are 2–3 mm long, and shed their pollen in late winter.

Distribution 
The plant is native to the mountains of Central Asia in northern Pakistan, northeastern Afghanistan, Tajikistan, Kyrgyzstan, eastern Kazakhstan, western China, western Mongolia, and south-central Russia.

Conservation 
Although it has a wide distribution and is not currently threatened, increased grazing by domestic livestock in the region could threaten it in the future.

References

External links 
 Conifers Around the World: Juniperus pseudosabina - Turkestan Juniper.

pseudosabina
Flora of Afghanistan
National symbols of Kyrgyzstan
Flora of Central Asia
Flora of Mongolia
Flora of Pakistan
Flora of Siberia
Flora of Xinjiang
Taxonomy articles created by Polbot
Dioecious plants